Manhunt is an upcoming American television limited series created by showrunner Monica Beletsky.  The series is a historical fiction conspiracy thriller that follows Edwin Stanton's search for John Wilkes Booth after the assassination of Abraham Lincoln, basing the story on James L. Swanson's book Manhunt: The 12-Day Chase for Lincoln's Killer.  Carl Franklin will direct, and Tobias Menzies will star as Stanton. The series is being produced for Apple TV+.

Premise 
After the assassination of Abraham Lincoln, his secretary of war and friend, Edwin Stanton begins the manhunt to track down John Wilkes Booth as it drives him mad.

Cast 
 Tobias Menzies as Edwin Stanton
 Anthony Boyle as John Wilkes Booth
 Lovie Simone as Mary Simms
 Matt Walsh as Samuel Mudd
 Brandon Flynn as Edwin Stanton Jr.
 Betty Gabriel as Elizabeth Keckley
 Will Harrison as David Herold
 Hamish Linklater as Abraham Lincoln
 Maxwell Korn as Robert Todd Lincoln
 Damian O'Hare as Thomas Eckert
 Patton Oswalt as Lafayette Baker
 Lili Taylor as Mary Todd Lincoln
 Timothy D. Sigmund as Jebidiah Diggler
 Anne Dudek as Ellen Stanton
 Mark Rand as Salmon P. Chase

Production 
In January 2022, a series adaptation of Manhunt: The 12-Day Chase for Lincoln's Killer by James L. Swanson was first announced. The series was created and written by showrunner Monica Beletsky as the first project in her overall deal with Apple, and Carl Franklin will direct. The following month, Anthony Boyle and Lovie Simone were added to the cast, with Boyle portraying John Wilkes Booth. Matt Walsh would be cast as Samuel Mudd in March. Additional casting would be announce in May.

Pre-production for the series began in Savannah, Georgia in February 2022, with filming beginning in May and set to finish by October. Filming of the assassination at Ford's Theatre began on location at a historic theatre in Philadelphia in June 2022.

References

External links
Manhunt at the Internet Movie Database

Apple TV+ original programming
Upcoming television series
American drama television series
Television series by Lionsgate Television
Television series by 3 Arts Entertainment